NPN may refer to:

Science and technology
 Next Protocol Negotiation, in computer networking
 Non-protein nitrogen, an animal feed component
 NPN transistor
 Normal Polish notation, in mathematics

Organisations
 National Party of Nigeria, a former political party
 New Politics Network, a UK think tank

Other uses
 Natural Health Product Number, required by the Canadian Natural Health Products Directorate